Nitro is a supervillain appearing in American comic books published by Marvel Comics. He first appeared in 1974.

Nitro is known for playing a part in the death of the Kree superhero Mar-Vell. He is also known for being responsible for the Stamford, Connecticut tragedy that started Marvel's Civil War crossover.

Publication history

Nitro first appeared in Captain Marvel  #34 (September 1974) and was created by Jim Starlin.

Fictional character biography
Robert Hunter was born in Scranton, Pennsylvania. He was an electrical engineer. Due to genetic alteration carried out on him by the Kree Lunatic Legion, Robert gained the ability to explode and reform himself at will and became a professional criminal. Some time later, he exposed Captain Marvel to a carcinogenic nerve gas; this encounter ultimately caused Captain Marvel's fatal cancer. Since then he has clashed with Earth's superhumans, who have found creative ways to defeat him, including using the "fractioning (separation) of his exploded mass" against him (essentially, if he can't reform himself after an explosion, he can't explode again).

Nitro later battled and was defeated by Omega the Unknown. He later escaped from Project: Pegasus, and then battled and was defeated by Spider-Man. Nitro was later freed from his containment canister by the Vulture in Albany, New York. He battled Skids of the New Mutants, and was unable to re-form his body within Skids' force field. He was then recruited by Thanos to serve him in a mission alongside several other supervillains, including Rhino, Super Skrull and Titanium Man. When the mission ended with the Silver Surfer rescuing the Earth-based villains, Nitro decided to take a space craft and explore space.

Much later, when the Kingpin was plotting his return to the New York underworld, he hired Nitro as one of many assassins to launch a carefully planned simultaneous attack on several New York crime bosses, including Don Fortunato, Hammerhead, Caesar Cicero, Silvermane, and many others; Nitro's target was Norman Osborn, who emerged relatively unscathed.

One such appearance where a foe took advantage of his limitations was in Iron Man vol. 3 #15, where he was hired to kill Tony Stark. A fight occurred between Nitro and Iron Man. Iron Man, whose sensors and telecommunications gear had been recently upgraded, noticed that every time he exploded, a high-frequency pulse was emitted by his body. Experimenting, Iron Man duplicated the pulse, causing Nitro to explode. After he exploded several times in a minute, he passed out from exhaustion (presumably, it takes energy to explode, and he could only spare so much before he passed out). Iron Man then handed him over to S.H.I.E.L.D., along with a recommendation on constructing a null-harness. He was sent to prison.

On another occasion, when Nitro's lawyer had him released from captivity, the villain immediately escaped, attempting to rob a bank for money to travel to San Francisco to kill Captain Marvel. He was opposed by Spider-Man, who defeated Nitro by webbing a barrel of tear gas to his body right before he exploded. As Nitro reformed, the suddenly evaporated tear gas mixed with his own molecules, leaving him violently ill and unable to fight back. Again, Nitro was arrested and sent to jail.

Later, Nitro is hired as a hit-man to kill Matt Murdock. He almost succeeds, killing several innocent people. Daredevil and the police work together to capture him.

At the start of the Civil War storyline, the New Warriors performed a videotaped raid of a house containing the Cobalt Man, Speedfreek, Coldheart and Nitro, who had recently escaped from prison during the Ryker's Island Incident. The New Warriors attacked each villain, with Namorita (the Sub-Mariner's cousin) going after Nitro. Slamming him into a school bus, Namorita taunted Nitro who then quotes "Oh, baby, don't you even know? You're playing with the big boys." Nitro then explodes causing a massive explosion. This explosion killed Namorita, Night Thrasher, Microbe, and the supervillains he was with during the raid along with sixty children at the nearby elementary school and some 600 people in the surrounding neighborhood in Stamford, Connecticut where the fight took place.

Nitro escaped in the back of a pickup truck and Wolverine soon began hunting him. Eventually Wolverine and a group of S.H.I.E.L.D. agents caught up with Nitro. The agents perished in the battle. Atlantean agents show up and capture Nitro for Namor and Wolverine follows them to New Pangea in an Iron Man armor to find Nitro has killed his interrogators in an attempt to escape. Wolverine captures Nitro and slices off his arm before leaving Nitro a prisoner of Atlantis.

Namor used Nitro in the destruction of New Pangea after moving his civilization to Latveria, a nation ruled by Doctor Doom. Nitro was held prisoner in Latveria until Penance brought him back to America after forcing him to suffer for the Stamford explosion, leaving him in critical condition and close to death.

Nitro later popped up as a member of Hood's crime syndicate when they stole a treasure from an Arabic diplomat and then had a celebratory party were the Hood shows them how he's the leader and the ways he delegates the job.

Nitro later appeared at a party in Madripoor that was held by Sabretooth.

Nitro was among the villains that fought Spider-Man on a submarine.

During the Avengers: Standoff! storyline, Nitro was an inmate of Pleasant Hill, a gated community established by S.H.I.E.L.D.

During the "Opening Salvo" part of the Secret Empire storyline, Nitro is recruited by Baron Helmut Zemo to join the Army of Evil. Nitro is among the villains on a rampage after what went down in Pleasant Hill. During his fight with the Defenders, Nitro defeated them by exploding.

Powers and abilities
Nitro can forcefully convert his whole body into gases, resulting in a violent explosion. This transformation could be limited to discrete portions of himself, such as his fist and aim the force in a specific direction. While in a gaseous form, he cannot reform if any fraction of his body is separated from the rest and must completely reconstitute himself before detonating again. The process does not have any healing qualities, so any wound received due to the explosion would be present when he reforms.

In other media

Television
Nitro appears in the Wolverine and the X-Men episode "Time Bomb", voiced by Liam O'Brien. This version is a Mutant desperate to keep his destructive abilities from hurting anyone due to his lack of control over them. In pursuit of his quest, he willingly accepts confinement within suspended animation in a mutant prison run by the Mutant Response Division (MRD). However, Toad discovers his capabilities and informs Quicksilver, who leads the Brotherhood of Mutants in freeing Nitro so they can use his powers for their own benefit. During his time with them, Nitro is kept under control by Psylocke's telepathic powers and forms a connection with the sympathetic Rogue due to her own uncontrollable powers. While transporting him to Genosha as an offering for Magneto, the Brotherhood are intercepted by the X-Men. During the ensuing fight, Nitro almost kills both teams, but Storm suspends him in midair so he can detonate safely. After Wolverine explains they would have destroyed Genosha if the X-Men had not intervened, the Brotherhood begrudgingly allow Nitro to be returned to the MRD.

Video games
 Nitro appears in Marvel: Ultimate Alliance 2, voiced by Steven Blum.
 Nitro appears as a boss in Marvel: Avengers Alliance.

References

External links
 Nitro at Marvel.com

Characters created by Jim Starlin
Characters created by Steve Englehart
Comics characters introduced in 1974
Fictional amputees
Fictional characters from Pennsylvania
Fictional characters with slowed ageing
Fictional electrical engineers
Fictional genetically engineered characters
Fictional mass murderers
Marvel Comics mutates
Marvel Comics supervillains